Ali Münif Yeğenağa (1874 – 1950) was an Ottoman politician and government minister, who played an active role in the Young Turk Revolution, he also served as the Minister of Education of the Ottoman Empire in 1918. He was furthermore a close friend of Talaat Pasha and played a prominent role in the Armenian genocide.

References 

1874 births
1950 deaths
People from Adana
20th-century Turkish politicians
Politicians of the Ottoman Empire
Committee of Union and Progress politicians
Armenian genocide perpetrators